Multi-Housing News (MHN) is an online publication focused on the apartment industry. It was also a print magazine between 1966 and July 2012.

History

Apartment Construction News 
The magazine was started in 1966, as Apartment Construction News. Wesley Wise was hired as the magazine’s first editor-in-chief.

In 1991, Gralla Publications merged with Miller Freeman Publications to create Miller Freeman, Inc. Nine years later, Dutch publishing company VNU acquired Miller Freeman, Inc. for $650 million in cash. VNU changed its name to Nielsen Holdings in 2007.

References

Online magazines published in the United States
Defunct magazines published in the United States
Magazines disestablished in 2012
Magazines established in 1966
Magazines published in New York City
Online magazines with defunct print editions
Professional and trade magazines